Lane Sutton (born 1997) is an American young entrepreneur and public speaker on social media and marketing issues.

Sutton first became known to the public at the age of 13 when The Boston Globe recognized him for meeting Tony Hsieh, speaking at PodCamp, early start to entrepreneurship and using the computer "at barely 8", and his experience. Lane became a subject of national interest at the age of 14 when being featured in The Wall Street Journal for a guest lecture at an Emerson College social media marketing class where he advised students about how to work big brands' social campaigns, as well as  Forbes  and CNN. 

Since May 2010, Lane has been a public speaker about the world of social media, marketing, youth, privacy, and reaching the younger generation. Lane has also been a strong advocate for privacy to promote the dangers of oversharing and the importance of maintaining a positive reputation online. He has lectured before large audiences of both students and adults across the United States.

At the age of 11, Lane created a website, Kid Critic to feature reviews by a kid, for kids and families about movies, books, activities, products, all from a youth perspective. The website encouraged kids to have a place to find interests as kids.

Sutton attended and spoke at the 2012 SXSW Interactive. In September 2013, Lane spoke at the TEDxRedmond conference. 

In 2015 Sutton graduated from Framingham High School.

References 

1997 births
Living people
People from Framingham, Massachusetts
Framingham High School alumni